Antonis Vasiliou (born 23 April 1996) is a Cypriot footballer who plays as a midfielder.

External links

1996 births
Living people
Cypriot footballers
Cypriot First Division players
AEL Limassol players
Association football midfielders
Sportspeople from Limassol
Expatriate footballers in Greece
Cypriot expatriates in Greece
Panachaiki F.C. players